Jude Postlethwaite (born 3 April 2002) is an Irish rugby union player, currently playing for United Rugby Championship and European Rugby Champions Cup side Ulster. His preferred position is centre.

He played rugby at RBAI, under future Ulster assistant coach Dan Soper, was top scorer in the 2020 Ulster Schools' Cup, and represented Ulster Schools. After leaving school, he joined Ulster's academy. During his time in the academy, he represented the Ireland national rugby sevens team in the World Rugby Sevens Series. He debuted for the national sevens team in 2021. He also represented Ireland U20 in the 2022 Six Nations Under 20s Championship.

In February 2022 he signed a development contract with Ulster, to be upgraded to a full senior contract after a year. He made his debut for Ulster from the bench in the United Rugby Championship against Cardiff in March 2023.

References

2002 births
Living people
Irish rugby union players
Ulster Rugby players
Rugby union centres
Ireland international rugby sevens players